Foliot may refer to:

 Foliot (timepiece), part of the verge escapement for early clocks
 A member of a fictional people in the high fantasy novel The Worm Ouroboros by E. R. Eddison
 A fictional magical creature in the Bartimaeus Sequence by Jonathan Stroud

Surname
 Gilbert Foliot (1110-1187), Abbot of Gloucester, Bishop of Hereford, Bishop of London
 Hugh Foliot (1155–1234), Bishop of Hereford
 Jordan Foliot (c 1249-1298), 1st Baron, Foliot, Lord of the Manor of Wellow, Nottinghamshire
 Ralph Foliot (died c. 1198), nephew of Gilbert
 Richard Foliot (fl. 1290), Knight of Jordan Castle, father of Jordan 
 Robert Foliot (died 1186), Bishop of Hereford